The 1889–90 season was the eighth season in the history of Burnley Football Club and their second in the Football League. Burnley ended the season in 11th position with a record of 4 wins, 5 draws and 13 defeats. As a result, the club was forced to apply for re-election to the League for the following season; the application was successful and Burnley retained their berth for the 1890–91 campaign. Burnley lost eight consecutive matches between 9 November 1889 and 22 February 1890 and did not achieve their first win in the League until 1 March 1890, when they beat Bolton Wanderers 7–0. The team was knocked out by Sheffield United in the First Round of the FA Cup, but they had success in the Lancashire Senior Cup, beating Rossendale United, Higher Walton and Haydock on the way to the final, where they defeated rivals Blackburn Rovers by two goals to nil.

Football League

Match results

Final league position

FA Cup

Match results

Lancashire Senior Cup

Match results

Player statistics
Key to positions

CF = Centre forward
FB = Fullback
GK = Goalkeeper

HB = Half-back
IF = Inside forward
OF = Outside forward

Statistics

References

Burnley F.C. seasons
Burnley